Ceraeochrysa lineaticornis is a species of green lacewing in the family Chrysopidae. It is found in North America.

References

Chrysopidae
Insects described in 1855